Gillespiana is an album by trumpeter Dizzy Gillespie featuring compositions by Lalo Schifrin recorded in 1960 and released on the Verve label. The album features Schifrin's suite  written to feature Gillespie and his orchestra.

Reception

The contemporaneous DownBeat reviewer awarded the album five stars and wrote: "Gillespiana is a distinguished work written expressly to exploit the trumpeter's remarkable talent."

Track listing 
All compositions by Lalo Schifrin
 "Prelude" - 5:52  
 "Blues" - 11:16  
 "Panamericana" - 4:39  
 "Africana" - 7:31  
 "Toccata" - 12:01

Personnel 
Dizzy Gillespie, John Frosk, Ernie Royal, Clark Terry, Joe Wilder - trumpet
Urbie Green, Frank Rehak, Britt Woodman - trombone
Paul Faulise - bass trombone
Jim Buffington (tracks 1-3), William Lister (tracks 4 & 5), Al Richman (tracks 1-3), Gunther Schuller, Morris Secon (tracks 4 & 5), Julius Watkins - French horn
Don Butterfield - tuba
Leo Wright - alto saxophone, flute 
Lalo Schifrin - piano, arranger
Art Davis - bass
Chuck Lampkin - drums
Candido Camero - conga
Jack Del Rio - bongos
Willie Rodriguez - timpani

References 

Dizzy Gillespie albums
1960 albums
Albums arranged by Lalo Schifrin
Albums produced by Norman Granz
Verve Records albums